Old Portsmouth is a district of the city of Portsmouth. It is the area covered by the original medieval town of Portsmouth as planned by Jean de Gisors. It is situated in the south west corner of Portsea Island.

The area contains many historic buildings including: Portsmouth Cathedral, Royal Garrison Church, The John Pounds Memorial Church (Unitarian), the Square Tower and Round Tower and Point Barracks, Portsmouth Point and the entrance to the Harbour. George Villiers Duke of Buckingham was assassinated in the Greyhound Pub in 1628. The area also has several historic pubs including the Bridge Tavern, Still and West, Spice Island Inn, and the Dolphin.

The area is also home to Portsmouth's small fishing fleet and fish market at Camber docks

It is now also the site of the Land Rover BAR headquarters. The very modern building is not to be considered in keeping with the historic surroundings. This was considered one of the factors in Portsmouth's being ruled out of contention for the race to be the UK's next city of culture.

External links 
 The Square Tower
 FOOPA Friends of Old Portsmouth

Areas of Portsmouth